Johann Schmid (13 January 1911 – 6 November 1941), was an Austrian fighter pilot credited with 45 victories between 14 May 1940 and 6 November 1941. He was also a recipient of the Knight's Cross of the Iron Cross.

Career
Schmid was born on 13 January 1911 in Gainfarn, in the Baden bei Wien region of Austria. He joined the Austrian Air Force in 1933. After the Anschluss in 1938 he was drafted into the Luftwaffe as an Oberfeldwebel and flew with the "Condor Legion" in the latter stages of the Spanish Civil War. Upon his return, he was transferred to the 1. Staffel (1st squadron) of Jagdgeschwader 2 "Richthofen" (JG 2—2nd Fighter Wing), a squadron of I. Gruppe (1st group).

Battle of France and Britain
At the start of the Battle of France, I. Gruppe of JG 2 supported Army Group A in its advance through the Ardennes towards the Meuse river. On 14 May, the Gruppe moved to an airfield near Bastogne. That day, Schmid claimed his first aerial victory when he shot down a Morane-Saulnier M.S.406 fighter. On 18 May, Schmid claimed a Westland Lysander army cooperation aircraft shot down near Beauvais. Following the German advance northwest, the Gruppe moved to an airfield at Beaulieu that day. The next day, he was credited with the destruction of a Hawker Hurricane fighter near Cambrai. On 20 May, I. Gruppe was relocated to Signy-le-Petit where they were deployed on the northern front of Army Group A. That evening, Schmid shot down a Curtiss P-36 Hawk fighter near Péronne.

On 20 September 1940, Schmid claimed his ninth aerial victory, a Spitfire fighter shot down south of London. He was then transferred and served as an instructor.

With Jagdgeschwader 26
Following his assignment as an instructor, Schmid joined Jagdgeschwader 26 "Schlageter" (JG 26—26th Fighter Wing) on 10 July 1941. There, he was assigned to the Geschwaderstab (headquarters unit) by Oberstleutnant Adolf Galland, the Geschwaderkommodore (wing commander). JG 26 was named after Albert Leo Schlageter, a martyr cultivated by the Nazi Party. At the time, the Geschwaderstab was based at Audembert near the English Channel. Schmid claimed his first aerial victory with JG 26 on 22 July. That day, Royal Air Force (RAF) Fighter Command attacked the Saint-Omer airfield with Supermarine Spitfire fighters from No. 308 Polish Fighter Squadron. The following day, the RAF flew an evening "Circus" mission with six Bristol Blenheim bombers to Mazingarbe escorted by Spitfire fighters. The Geschwaderstab, led by Galland, intercepted the escorting fighters and Schmid claimed a Spitfire shot down. 

On 3 August, the RAF flew a series of anti shipping attacks. Defending against these attacks, Schmid claimed a Spitfire destroyed. Sarkar suggested that his opponenent may have been RAF pilot Flight Lieutenant Eric Lock from No. 611 Squadron. Lock, flying Spitfire Mk V W3257, was reported by his own side as shot down by anti-aircraft fire on 3 August 1941 near Boulogne, but whose crash site was not ascertained. Sarkar, who cross referenced Lock's disappearance with Luftwaffe combat claims for the same day, discovered that while Lock's Spitfire was the only RAF plane lost that day, Schmid reported having shot down a Spitfire into the sea near Calais. In reality, Lock was lost in the morning of the 3 August. Schmid claimed his victory in the early evening at 18:32.

Schmid claimed three Spitfire fighters shot down on 7 August likely from No. 12 Group's Digby Wing. That day, the RAF flew "Circus" No. 67 targeting Saint-Omer airfield with six Blenheim bombers escorted by twelve fighter squadrons. Before noon on 9 August, Schmid and his wingman Unteroffizier Heinz Richter, claimed two Spitfires from the Royal Australian Air Force (RAAF) No. 452 Squadron. Later that day, Schmid claimed two further Spitfires shot down defending against a "Rodeo" attack by No. 11 Group. The following day, a German freighter came under attack from three Blenheim bombers which took off from RAF Manston at 12:50. The Geschwaderstab intercepted the RAF bombers and escort fighters north of Gravelines. In the resulting aerial combat, Schmid claimed two Hurricane fighters from No. 242 Squadron and a Spitfire, the Spitfire managed to return. On 12 August, Schmid shot down a Spitfire fighter from either No. 19 or No. 152 Squadron. That day, Bomber Command attacked Cologne, supported by a number of diversionary missions.

On 19 August, the RAF flew "Circus" No. 81, the mission which also dropped a spare set of artificial legs for Wing Commander Douglas Bader at Saint-Omer airfield. The primary target of the operation was Béthune. Defending against this attack, Schmid claimed a Blenheim bomber which was shot down northwest of Dunkirk and belonged to No. 18 Squadron. That evening, the RAF flew "Circus" No. 82 to Hazebrouck and Schmid shot down a Spitfire fighter belonging to No. 222 Squadron from this attack force, taking his total to 24 aerial victory claims. For this, he was decorated with the Knight's Cross of the Iron Cross on 21 August 1941 and promoted to Hauptmann (captain).

Squadron leader and death
Along with his promotion, Schmid was appointed Staffelkapitän (squadron leader) of 8. Staffel of JG 26, replacing Oberleutnant Hans-Jürgen Westphal who had been injured. 8. Staffel was subordinated to III. Gruppe and at the time commanded by Hauptmann Gerhard Schöpfel and based at Ligescourt. His scoring spree continued, as he scored 11 victories in September and a Spitfire on 3 October 1941.

On 6 November 1941, as the Battle of Britain was petering out, he led the whole III. Gruppe into combat against a dozen Spitfires. In this encounter, he claimed a Spitfire shot down. His opponent may have been Sergeant B.M. Geissman of No. 452 Squadron RAAF. The aircraft immediately disintegrated and sank, taking Schmid with it. Following his death, he was replaced by Oberleutnant Karl Borris as commander of 8. Staffel. Posthumously, he was promoted to Major (major).

Summary of career

Aerial victory claims
According to Obermaier, Schmid was credited with 45 victories in 137 missions, all over the Western Front. Mathews and Foreman, authors of Luftwaffe Aces: Biographies and Victory Claims, researched the German Federal Archives and found records for 40 aerial victory claims, plus five further unconfirmed claims, all of which were claimed on the Western Front.

Awards
Iron Cross (1939)
Knight's Cross of the Iron Cross on 21 August 1941 as Hauptmann and Staffelkapitän of the 8./Jagdgeschwader 26 "Schlageter"

Notes

References

Citations

Bibliography

External links
Johann Schmid @ Aces of the Luftwaffe 
Johann Schmid @ Luftwaffe39-45.historia Retrieved 10 December 2011 
 Retrieved 29 December 2012
 Retrieved 7 January 2013
 Retrieved 7 January 2013

1911 births
1941 deaths
German World War II pilots
Recipients of the Knight's Cross of the Iron Cross
German military personnel of the Spanish Civil War
Condor Legion personnel
People from Lower Austria
Austrian military personnel
Luftwaffe personnel killed in World War II
Aviators killed by being shot down
People lost at sea